Rollout or rollout allowance in North-American drag racing is the difference between actual acceleration time and measured acceleration time.  For the published 0 to 60 mph acceleration time in North America, a rolling start is used, beginning  after the initial standing start position.  The method approximates the behaviour of dragstrip measurement equipment for 1/4 mile racing, which was historically limited to only recording after the vehicle had passed over a start line.  This leads to a 0.2–0.3-second apparent difference, with larger wheel sizes giving a larger exaggeration in timing.

History
Historically acceleration measurement took place using dragstrip equipment placed over a measured distance, with a light gate at the start and end.  These light gates measured the point in time at which a vehicle passed the measurement point, rather than the point at which movement (acceleration) first occurred leading to a slightly faster apparent time.

Standardization
With the advent of on-board measurement via Global Positioning System timing, the North-American car magazines sought to standardise the precise measurements and to account for the historical difference in a way that was consistent between publications, and still comparable to existing published measurements for older vehicles made via traditional light gates.

The result was the standardization of a "1 foot rollout [allowance]" (30 cm) derived by accurately measuring a complete acceleration run, then subtracting the time taken for the first  of vehicle movement, with only the derived timing being published.

Further reading

 
 
 
 
 

Drag racing
Measurement
Car performance